Boston City FC is a men's soccer club based in Revere, Massachusetts that competes in the Northeast Division of USL League Two. The club was founded in 2015; their inaugural season was 2016.  The club's colors are red, navy, and white, and plays its home matches at Harry Della Russo Stadium.

History
Boston City FC was founded in 2015 by Renato Valentim and Jorge Ferreira da Silva (Palhinha).  In their inaugural season (2016), the club placed second in NPSL's 9-team Northeast Atlantic Conference.

With its inaugural season results, City qualified for the 2017 U.S. Open Cup via an At-Large berth. The team won its first tournament game on May 10, defeating PDL side Western Mass Pioneers via penalty kicks. The Lions lost 2-1 at home to GPS Omens of the BSSL in the second round. 

In early 2018, the organization announced a second team that would compete within the Bay State Soccer League, a fully amateur state run league affiliated within Region I of the United States Adult Soccer Association. The team, initially called Boston City FC Under 20s and later simply Boston City FC II, competed within Division 3 North in both 2018 and 2019. The second team also entered 2019 U.S. Open Cup qualification in late 2018, reaching the second round before falling to Safira FC.

Having not played in 2020 due to the COVID-19 pandemic, Boston City FC returned in 2021 under new head coach and former defender Gabriel De Souza, finishing fifth in the NPSL North Atlantic Conference with a 3-6-1 record. 

Boston City FC moved to USL League Two on January 24, 2022.

Roster

Front office
 Renato Valentim - Owner
 Marcelo Nascimento - President
 Rubinho Lima - Broadcasting

Year-by-year

References

External links

Boston City FC at National Premier Soccer League

2015 establishments in Massachusetts
Association football clubs established in 2015
Soccer clubs in Massachusetts
National Premier Soccer League teams
Revere, Massachusetts
Sports in Suffolk County, Massachusetts